Jonathan Persson (born 13 November 1994) is a German badminton player. Persson has won some international tournament including at the 2014 Suriname, 2017 Zambia International in the mixed doubles event, and at the 2017 Egypt International in the men's doubles event.

Achievements

BWF International Challenge/Series (5 titles, 6 runners-up) 
Men's singles

Men's doubles

Mixed doubles

  BWF International Challenge tournament
  BWF International Series tournament
  BWF Future Series tournament

References

External links 
 
 

1994 births
Living people
German male badminton players